Bill Beck Field is a baseball venue located on the campus of the University of Rhode Island in Kingston, Rhode Island, United States.  It is home to the Rhode Island Rams baseball team, a member of the NCAA Division I Atlantic 10 Conference.  The field was built in 1966 and is named after former Rams baseball and football coach Bill Beck.  It has a capacity of 1,000 spectators.

The field is located behind Mackal Field House, the home venue of Rhode Island's men's and women's indoor track & field teams.

Renovations
In 2000, extensive renovations to the field began.  The playing surface was leveled and resodded, and a new sprinkler system was added.  In 2001, the field's dugouts were replaced.  In 2002, an electronic scoreboard was installed, two batting cages were added down the right field line, and the field's fencing was replaced.  Later, matching batting cages were added down the left field line.

In 2007, a $1 million donation to the baseball program led to $1.4 million renovations on Bill Beck Field.  Completed in time for the 2009 season, a new backstop, scoreboard, fencing, and bullpens were constructed.  Also, a new FieldTurf surface was installed.

Other uses
In 2013, the field was used for the final game of the America East Tournament, after rain and scheduling conflicts forced America East Conference officials to move the game from its scheduled venue, Edward A. LeLacheur Park in Lowell, Massachusetts. In the game, Binghamton defeated Maine, 4–0.

The venue is also used for other amateur tournaments.

See also
 List of NCAA Division I baseball venues

References

College baseball venues in the United States
Baseball venues in Rhode Island
Rhode Island Rams baseball
1966 establishments in Rhode Island
Sports venues completed in 1966
Buildings and structures in South Kingstown, Rhode Island